Andrea Lee (born 2 December 1998 in Kuala Lumpur) is a Malaysian professional squash player
and a Division III Athlete for Colby College.  As of February 2018, she was ranked number 80 in the world. She won the 2017 Malaysian Squash Tour X professional tournament.

References

1998 births
Living people
Malaysian female squash players
21st-century Malaysian women